Nijmegen (Nijmeegs: Nimwèège ) is the largest city in the Dutch province of Gelderland and tenth largest of the Netherlands as a whole; it is located on the Waal river close to the German border. Nijmegen is the oldest city in the Netherlands, the second to be recognized as such in Roman times, and in 2005 celebrated 2,000 years of existence. 

Nijmegen became a free imperial city in 1230 and in 1402 a Hanseatic city. Since 1923 it has been a university city with the opening of a Catholic institution now known as the Radboud University Nijmegen. The city is well known for the International Four Days Marches Nijmegen event.

Its population in 2022 was 179,000; the municipality is part of the Arnhem–Nijmegen metropolitan area, with 736,107 inhabitants in 2011.

Population centres 
The municipality is formed by the city of Nijmegen, incorporating the former villages of Hatert, Hees and Neerbosch, as well as the urban expansion project of Waalsprong, situated north of the river Waal and including the village of Lent and the hamlet of 't Zand, as well as the new suburbs of Nijmegen-Oosterhout and Nijmegen–Ressen.

Proximity of border with Germany 
The city lies a few kilometers from the border with Germany, and to some extent the westernmost villages in the municipality of Kranenburg, Germany, function as dormitories for people who work in the Dutch city of Nijmegen in part due to the immigration of Dutch people from the region who were attracted by the lower house pricing just across the border.

History

Antiquity 
The first mention of Nijmegen in history is in the first century BCE, when the Romans built a military camp on the place where Nijmegen was to appear; the location had great strategic value because of the surrounding hills, which give a good view over the river Waal and Rhine valley.

By 69, when the Batavi, the original inhabitants of the Rhine and Meuse (Maas) delta, revolted, a village called Oppidum Batavorum had formed near the Roman camp. This village was destroyed in the revolt, but when it had ended the Romans built another, bigger camp where the Legio X Gemina was stationed. Soon after, another village formed around this camp.

In 98, Nijmegen was the first of two settlements in what is now the Kingdom of the Netherlands to receive Roman city rights.

In 103, the X Gemina was restationed in Vindobona, now Vienna, which may have been a major blow to the economy of the village around the camp, losing around 5000 inhabitants. In 104 Emperor Trajan renamed the town, which became known as Ulpia Noviomagus Batavorum, Noviomagus for short, the ultimate origin of the current name.

A collection of artifacts from Roman antiquity were compiled by Johannes Smetius in the 17th century, called the Smetius Collection.

In January 2022, archaeologists led by Pepijn van de Geer announced the discovery of an intact 2,000-year-old blue glass bowl with a vertical stripe pattern in Nijmegen. Researchers assume that this well-preserved bowl was made in a glass workshop. According to van de Geer, this type of bowl was made by allowing molten glass to cool and harden over a mold.

Middle Ages 
Beginning in the latter half of the 4th century, Roman power decreased and Noviomagus eventually became part of Francia. It also appeared around this time on the Tabula Peutingeriana.  In the 8th century Emperor Charlemagne maintained his palatium in Nijmegen in 777, and possibly on at least three more occasions. During his brief deposition of 830, the emperor Louis the Pious was sent to Nijmegen by his son, Lothair I. Thanks to the Waal, trade flourished.

The powerful Henry VI, Holy Roman Emperor, was born at Nijmegen in 1165. In 1230 his son Frederick II granted Nijmegen city rights. In 1247, the city was ceded to the count of Guelders as collateral for a loan. The loan was never repaid, and Nijmegen has been a part of Gelderland ever since. This did not hamper trade; Nijmegen even became part of the Hanseatic League in 1364.

The arts also flourished in this period. Famous medieval painters like the Limbourg brothers were born and educated in Nijmegen. Some of Hieronymus Bosch's ancestors also came from the city.

Early modern period 
During the Dutch Revolt, trade came to a halt and even though Nijmegen became a part of the Republic of United Provinces after its capture from the Spanish in 1591, it remained a border town and had to endure multiple sieges. 

In 1678 Nijmegen was host to the negotiations between the European powers that aimed to put an end to the constant warfare that had ravaged the continent for years. The result was the Treaty of Nijmegen that, unfortunately, failed to provide for a lasting peace.

In 1702, at the start of the War of the Spanish Succession, the French nearly took Nijmegen by surprise. Only because of the intervention of an Anglo-Dutch army under the Earl of Athlone and the bravery of the citizens of Nijmegen was the Assault on Nijmegen repulsed.

In the second half of the 19th century, the fortifications around the city became a major problem. There were too many inhabitants inside the walls, but the fortifications could not be demolished because Nijmegen was deemed as being of vital importance to the defence of the Netherlands. When events in the Franco-Prussian war proved that old-fashioned fortifications were no longer of use, this policy was changed and the fortifications were dismantled in 1874. The old castle had already been demolished in 1797, so that its bricks could be sold.

World War II 
Through the second half of the 19th century and the first half of the 20th century, Nijmegen grew steadily. The Waal was bridged in 1878 by a rail bridge and in 1936 by a car bridge, which was claimed to be Europe's biggest bridge at the time. In 1923 the current Radboud University Nijmegen was founded and in 1927 a channel was dug between the Waal and Meuse (Maas) rivers.

In 1940, the Netherlands was invaded by Germany, with Nijmegen being the first Dutch city to fall into German hands. On 22 February 1944, Nijmegen was heavily bombed by American planes, causing great damage to the city centre. It was subsequently claimed by the Allies that the American pilots thought they were bombing the German city of Kleve, while the Germans alleged that it was a planned operation authorised by the Dutch government in exile. The Dutch organization for investigating wartime atrocities, the NIOD, announced in January 2005 that its study of the incident confirmed that it was an accident caused by poor communications and chaos in the airspace. Over 750 people died in the bombardment.

During September 1944, the city saw heavy fighting during Operation Market Garden. The objective of the Battle of Nijmegen was mainly to prevent the Germans from destroying the bridges. Capturing the road bridge allowed the British Army XXX Corps to attempt to reach the 1st British Airborne Division in Arnhem. The bridge was heavily defended by over 300 German troops on both the north and south sides with close to 20 anti-tank guns and two anti-aircraft guns, supported with artillery. The Germans' late attempt to blow the road bridge was possibly foiled by a local Dutch resistance hero, Jan van Hoof, who is said to have cut the wires to the bridge. The Germans made repeated attacks on the bridge using bombs attached to driftwood, midget submarines and later resorted to shelling the bridge with 88mm barrages. Troops  were positioned on the bridge giving an excellent arc of fire in case of attack. Troops that couldn't fit onto the bridge were positioned in a bombed-out house slightly upstream of the bridge. During the shelling, the house was hit, killing six soldiers and wounding one. Nijmegen was liberated from German occupation by the British Grenadier Guards of the Guards Armoured Division, as well as elements of the American 82nd Airborne Division in September 1944. The city would later be used as a springboard for Operation Veritable, the invasion across the Rhine River by Allied Troops.

Post-war period 
In the period immediately following the end of the war, a site near Nijmegen was selected to house German nationals who were to be deported from the Netherlands, called the Mariënbosch concentration camp. It operated from 1946 to 1948.

On 23 February 1981, the Nijmegen police department and the Dutch Army stormed the Piersonstraat and Zeigelhof, a squatted housing block in the city centre of Nijmegen. Using 200 riot vans, three Leopard 1s, three armoured personnel carriers, a helicopter, 1,200 policemen, and 750 members of the armed forces, they evicted the squatters and demolished the block, while clouding the entire area in teargas and CS gas. This received enormous backlash in local politics. While the city government wanted the squatters out to build a parking garage, most of the population wanted affordable housing to be built in the area.

The city council was largely dominated by left-wing and progressive parties such as Green Party, Democrats 66, Socialist Party, and Labour. At times Nijmegen has been the only major city in the Netherlands with a solely left-wing government. The current mayor is Hubert Bruls.

Nijmegen celebrated its 2000th year of existence in 2005. It is considered the oldest city in the Netherlands. In gaining this qualification, it has competed with the city of Maastricht.

In November 2005, the city centre of Nijmegen was the site of the assassination of political activist Louis Sévèke by a former activist, Marcel Teunissen, who was arrested in 2007 in Spain and extradited to the Netherlands. Teunissen has also been accused of bank robbery. He committed his acts out of revenge for a forcible eviction from the squatter scene by Louis Sévèke.

Geography

Climate 
Nijmegen has an oceanic climate (Cfb). It is one of the warmest cities of the Netherlands, especially during summer, when the highest temperatures in the country are usually measured in the triangle Roermond–Nijmegen–Eindhoven. The lack of north–south oriented mountain ranges in Europe make this area prone to sudden shifts in weather, giving the region a semi-continental climate.

Some of the northernmost wineries in the world are found just outside Nijmegen, around Groesbeek, a suburban village south-east of Nijmegen.

The heat wave coincided with that year's Four Day Marches, which were cancelled after the first day, when two people died of hyperthermia-related causes.

Sights

Historical remains

Few Roman remains are visible today; a fragment of the old city wall can be seen near the casino and the foundations of the amphitheatre are traced in the paving of the present-day Rembrandtstraat. The Valkhof Museum, on the Valkhof, has a permanent display of the history of Nijmegen, including artifacts from the Roman era. Additionally, they usually have temporary exhibitions of more and less famous artists. During building works in the Waapsrong area, ruins from the Roman times were found which were identified in 2022 as those of a Roman sauna. This 3,600 year-old sauna is the first of its kind in mainland Europe. 

Not many very old buildings are left in town: first the Americans carpet-bombed it in February 1944, later the Germans shelled it for about five months after the liberation in September 1944, and finally there were a number of vigorous city planners in the 1950s, 60s and 70s who finished the demolition. There are still a few noteworthy sights, however. Valkhof hill downtown features a Carolingian chapel (eighth, ninth century AD) and a small remainder of an imperial castle that was demolished in 1798. The 750-year old Stevenskerk had to be reconstructed after WWII.

Politics

The city council has 39 seats. After the 2002 municipal elections, the three major parties, GroenLinks (9 seats), PvdA (8 seats) and SP (6 seats) formed a coalition. Because these are all left-wing parties, Nijmegen received the nickname 'Havana on the Waal'. Although such majorities are not exceptional (compare Amsterdam) and sometimes also form coalitions (see Muntendam), this is unusual for a city this size. Since such a left-wing coalition might be possible at a national level after the 2006 general election, the achievements of this council are often scrutinised. After the 2006 municipal election such a coalition became possible in many more municipalities, making the example even more interesting.

The municipal elections of 7 March 2006 saw an increase of 4,6% of the votes for these three parties taken together, which could be seen as increased support for the coalition. However, nationally these parties scored much better, recovering from an electoral blow of the 2002 elections. Then again, the Leefbaar parties that caused the loss then and lost most of their votes this time have no branch in Nijmegen, which makes this comparison less valid. Among the three big parties, there was a shift from GroenLinks, who lost 6.5%, to PvdA, who won 6.4% and SP, who won 2.3%. As a result, it is no longer the biggest party. The seat assignment is now as shown in the table. The three-party coalition was returned to office.

After the 2010 Dutch municipal election, the PvdA lost three of its eleven seats. Short before the elections, there were problems with the SP. Therefore, GroenLinks and the PvdA formed a coalition with the social-liberal D66.

The municipal elections of 19 March 2014 saw the Socialist Party narrowly becoming the largest party in the Nijmegen city council after gaining three more seats. The Greens were only some 200 votes behind, while the Liberal Democrats (D'66) gained another seat, while Labour lost half their support, becoming as small as the liberal-conservative VVD. The coalition government was formed between the three centre-left and leftist parties SP, GroenLinks and PvdA, and a local party called The Nijmegen Group (De Nijmeegse Fractie). It also had informal support from the United Senior Party (VSP).

Later in 2014, a city council member of the VVD, Paul Eigenhuijsen, left the VVD group. The former leader of the group, Hayke Veldman, had gone to the House of Representatives, and thus left the city council. Eigenhuijsen had been second on the party list, but he was not elected to the position of leader. Thereafter, he left the group and started his own one-man group, called Liberal Nijmegen.

Twin and sister cities 
Nijmegen is twinned with:
 Albany, New York
 Gaziantep, Turkey
 Higashimatsuyama, Japan
 Masaya, Nicaragua
 Oulu, Finland
 Pskov, Russia
 Suzhou, China

Culture

Events

Four Days Marches 
Nijmegen has long been known for its annual Four Days Marches, beginning on the third Tuesday of each July. The marches are supplemented with festivities such as de-Affaire.

People

Natives
 Henry VI, Holy Roman Emperor (1165–1197)
 Limbourg brothers (1385–1416) medieval painters
 Giovanni Antoniano (died 1588), Patristic scholar
 Petrus Canisius (1521–1597), Catholic saint
 Henriette Pressburg (1788–1863), mother of Karl Marx
 Sophie Pressburg (1797–1854), grandmother of Anton and Gerard Philips who founded Philips Electronics
 Pieter Claude Bijleveld (1828–1898), mayor 
 Carli Biessels (1936–2016), writer
 Roosje Glaser (1914–2000), dancer and Holocaust survivor
 Daphne Deckers (born 1968), model, host, writer and occasional actress
 Princess Margarita of Bourbon-Parma (born 1972), member of the Dutch Royal Family
 Prince Hugo de Bourbon de Parme (born 1997), member of the Dutch Royal Family
 Saadia Himi (born 1984), Miss Netherlands Earth 2004
 Amira Willighagen (born 2004), classical singer
 Jos Hermens (born 1950), athlete
 Anne Quist (born 1957), Olympic rower
 Ron de Groot (born 1960), footballer
 Pie Geelen (born 1972), Olympic swimmer
 Frank Demouge (born 1982), footballer
 Nacer Barazite (born 1990), footballer
 Frank Boeijen (born 1957), musician
 Frans de Waard (born 1965), sound artist, publisher
 Roxane van Iperen (born 1976), writer

Other residents 
 Titus Brandsma – (1881–1942), a Carmelite friar, philosopher and Resistance member
 Dries van Agt – (born 1931), politician
 Nina Simone – (1933–2003), jazz musician
 Edward Ka-Spel – (born 1954), vocalist of The Legendary Pink Dots
 Perry Ubeda – (born 1971), kickboxer
 Karapet Karapetyan – (born 1982), kickboxer
 Sóley Tómasdóttir - (born 1974), activist and former icelandic politician

Religion 

In 1968, theologians in the Catholic Church issued what is now known as the Nijmegen Statement, demanding sweeping reforms in the Vatican's Holy Office, previously known as The Inquisition, and calling for greater scope for theological inquiry. Among its signatories was theologian Fr. Joseph Ratzinger, then a member of the faculty at the University of Tübingen, but later the head of the successor to the Holy Office, the Congregation for the Doctrine of the Faith, and later still Pope Benedict XVI.

The Nijmegen Statement said: "Any form of Inquisition however subtle, not only harms the development of sound theology, it also causes irreparable damage to the credibility of the church". The signatories, a group of predominantly German-speaking theologians asserted that "the freedom of theologians, and theology in the service of the church, regained by Vatican II, must not be jeopardised again." The signatories pledged their loyalty to the Pope, but argued that the teaching office of pope and bishops "cannot and must not supersede, hamper and impede the teaching task of theologians as scholars."

Sport 

Sport in the city is principally focused on its football club NEC Nijmegen or just NEC, short for Nijmegen Eendracht Combinatie, which plays at the 12,500 seat Stadion de Goffert. The club plays in the Eredivisie.

Bandy Vereniging Nijmegen is the biggest bandy club in the country. The national team got celebrated by over a hundred fans and Mayor Hubert Bruls after winning Division B of the 2018 Bandy World Championship.

The city is also home to one of the country's oldest cricket clubs, Quick 1888, a current member of the KNCB. Formed in 1888, the club is the largest cricket club in the east of the country and was formed 13 years after the first club, Utile Dulci from Deventer. The cricket club has both men's and women's teams. The city also has the Nijmegen Devils, an Ice hockey club. Nijmegen also plays host to the annual Zevenheuvelenloop (Seven Hills Run), an annual  run recognised by the IAAF as a Bronze Label race.

Economy and infrastructure

Economy 
The three main employers in Nijmegen are:

1. Radboud University;

2. The three hospitals in the city: Radboud University Medical Center, Sint Maartenskliniek, and Canisius-Wilhelmina Ziekenhuis (CWZ);

3. The semiconductor industry. Nexperia and Ampleon (both spun off from NXP Semiconductors) are headquartered in the city. Multinational companies such as Qualcomm, Photronics Inc, and Applied Materials also have facilities in Nijmegen.

Other notable companies headquartered in Nijmegen include Synthon, a Dutch multinational pharmaceutical company and Vaxxinova, an EW group subsidiary which produces animal vaccines.

More room for the river Waal 
To prevent flooding in the near future, the Dutch government is changing the course of more than 30 rivers throughout the country. These measures, taken along the rivers IJssel, Lek, Maas and Waal, are known as ‘Room for the River’. Room for the river Waal as it passes Nijmegen is one of these measures. As part of this, the artificial island Veur-Lent was created in 2015.

The river Waal not only has a sharp bend near Nijmegen, it also forms a bottleneck. In 1993 and 1995 this led to high water and floods. To prevent this from happening again and to protect inhabitants of the city and its surroundings against the water, work has been done to relocate the Waal dike in Lent and to excavate a large ancillary channel in the flood plains, creating an island in the Waal. The large-scale project involves the construction of three bridges, new dikes and concrete water barriers. On the island, a project of alleged sustainable urbanism is giving birth to an urban river park with possibilities for recreation, culture, water and nature.

Sustainability 
Nijmegen is a vibrant and progressive city with a number of Green Initiatives, as well as residents who prioritise quality of life and sustainability. Europe's first food forest is located in the village of Gresbeek, and visitors can take sustainable guided tours of the city aboard the solar-powered "Sun Train" (Zonnetrein).

Transport 
Nijmegen has five railway stations: Nijmegen, Nijmegen Dukenburg, Nijmegen Heyendaal, Nijmegen Lent and Nijmegen Goffert. The central station is connected to the national Intercity network. The bus company Breng (a subsidiary of Hermes) operates the city buses in the Arnhem-Nijmegen metropolitan area.

Like most Dutch cities, bicycles are an important mode of transport. The city is connected to Arnhem,  to the north, by a "fietssnelweg" (fast cycle highway) which crosses the Snelbinder bridge in the city. During 2010–2012 the cycle highway received upgrades to further encourage the use of bicycles for transport between Nijmegen and Arnhem. In May 2016, the Dutch Fietsersbond (Cyclists' Union) awarded the 2016 Fietsstad (Cycling City) award to the city of Nijmegen.

The river is a busy freight transport route, with barges to the city as well as passing through on the way between the industrial regions of Germany and the docks at Amsterdam, Rotterdam and Hook of Holland. The Maas–Waal Canal also carries freight through the city.

Education 

Nijmegen is host to Radboud University Nijmegen. Founded in 1923 as the first Catholic university in the Netherlands, it used to be called Catholic University of Nijmegen until 2004, when it took its current name. , it had 22,142 students and 4,921 staff in fte. Radboud University runs the High Field Magnetic Laboratory which is able to achieve some of the highest fields available in Europe at 38 teslas (continuous). The facility is available to outside users, primarily for research purposes.

The education and social work departments of the HAN University of Applied Sciences, school for higher-level vocational training are also located in Nijmegen, as are that school's medical departments.

In addition to these institutions, there is also an intermediate-level vocational school and a number of secondary schools: Groenschool Nijmegen, Kandinsky College, Nijmeegse Scholengemeenschap Groenewoud (NSG), Citadel College, Stedelijke Scholengemeenschap Nijmegen (SSGN), Canisius College, St. Jorisschool, Mondial College, the Stedelijk Gymnasium (formally the "Latijnse school", founded in the 16th century), the Karel de Grote College, Montessori College and the Dominicus College. Of note is also Leefwerkschool Eigenwijs, which caters to students from all over the Netherlands who have been repeatedly expelled from "regular" high schools. Leefwerkschool Eigenwijs has its roots in the local activist movement of the early 1980s and is the only school of its kind recognised in the Netherlands.

Nijmegen is also an important centre of Psycholinguistics, home to the Max Planck Institute of Psycholinguistics and the F.C. Donders Centre for Cognitive Neuroimaging.

The Nobel Prize for Physics in 2010 was awarded to Andre Geim and Konstantin Novoselov while at Radboud University "for groundbreaking experiments regarding the two-dimensional material graphene."

Notes

References

Literature

Bibliography

External links

 
 https://en.intonijmegen.com
https://www.nijmegenmijnstad.nl

 
Cities in the Netherlands
Municipalities of Gelderland
Populated places in Gelderland
Populated places established in the 1st century
0s establishments in the Roman Empire
Free imperial cities
Members of the Hanseatic League
Roman legionary fortresses in Netherlands
Roman fortifications in Germania Inferior